Ottorino Respighi (9 July 187918 April 1936) was an Italian composer, violinist, teacher, and musicologist and one of the leading Italian composers of the early 20th century. His compositions range over operas, ballets, orchestral suites, choral songs, chamber music, and transcriptions of Italian compositions of the 16th–18th centuries, but his best known and most performed works are his three orchestral tone poems which brought him international fame: Fountains of Rome (1916), Pines of Rome (1924), and Roman Festivals (1928).

Respighi was born in Bologna to a musical and artistic family. He was encouraged by his father to pursue music at a young age, and took formal tuition in the violin and piano. In 1891, he enrolled at the Liceo Musicale di Bologna, where he studied the violin, viola, and composition, was principal violinist at the Russian Imperial Theatre, and studied briefly with Nikolai Rimsky-Korsakov. He relocated to Rome in 1913 to become professor of composition at the Liceo Musicale di Santa Cecilia. During this period he married his pupil, singer Elsa Olivieri-Sangiacomo. In 1923, Respighi quit his professorship to dedicate time to tour and compose, but continued to teach until 1935. He performed and conducted in various capacities across the United States and South America from 1925 until his death.

In late 1935, while composing his opera Lucrezia, Respighi became ill and was diagnosed with bacterial endocarditis. He died four months later, aged 56. His wife Elsa outlived him for almost 60 years, championing her late husband's works and legacy until her death in 1996. Conductor and composer Salvatore Di Vittorio completed several of Respighi's incomplete and previously unpublished works, including the finished Violin Concerto in A major (1903) which premiered in 2010.

Biography

Early years 
Respighi was born on 9 July 1879 at 8 Via Guido Reni, an apartment building to the side of Palazzo Fantuzzi. He was the youngest child of Giuseppe and Ersilia (née Putti) Respighi. His brother Alberto died at age nine, and he had one sister, Amelia. His parents came from artistic families; his maternal grandfather and great-grandfather were distinguished sculptors, and his paternal grandfather was a cathedral organist. Giuseppe was an accomplished pianist and teacher who encouraged his son's musical inclinations, giving basic tuition in piano and violin from an early age. To his father's initial disappointment, Respighi showed little interest in music until he was almost eight. Shortly after Respighi began formal violin tuition, he quit abruptly after his teacher hit him on the hand with a ruler when he played a passage incorrectly. He resumed lessons several weeks later, this time with a more patient teacher. His piano skills, too, were a hit-and-miss affair initially, but his father arrived home one day and was surprised to find his son performing the Symphonic Studies by Robert Schumann; Respighi had learned to play the piece in secret. Respighi quickly took to other instruments; for example, he learned to play the harp in the course of several days.

Life in Bologna, 1890–1913 

Respighi was schooled at Ginnasio Guinizelli in Bologna for two years from October 1890. In 1891, he enrolled at the Liceo Musicale di Bologna, where he studied the violin and viola for the next seven years with his teacher, Federico Sarti. Four years into his course at the Liceo Musicale, Respighi began classes in musical composition with Giuseppe Martucci, the Liceo's director, and music history with Luigi Torchi. By the time he reached twenty, Respighi was performing in the orchestra at the Teatro Comunale di Bologna. Martucci, a proponent of Bologna's musical life and composer of non-operatic Italian music, became an influential figure for the young Respighi. In 1899, he received a diploma in the playing of the violin. By this time, Respighi had developed a fondness for languages, demonstrated by his large book collection, which contained atlases and dictionaries. In his lifetime, Respighi became fluent in eleven languages and read literature in all of them.

In the winter of 1900, Respighi accepted the role of principal violist in the orchestra of the Russian Imperial Theatre in Saint Petersburg during its season of Italian opera. While there he met Russian composer Nikolai Rimsky-Korsakov, whom Respighi greatly admired, and studied orchestration and composition with him over the course of five months. Respighi returned to Russia in the winter of 1902 for further performances and received more tuition from Rimsky-Korsakov; both meetings heavily influenced his orchestrations. The piece was first performed as part of Respighi's final examination in June 1901, and was a resounding success. The 21-year-old Respighi then received his diploma in composition and Martucci said of the composer: "Respighi is not a pupil, Respighi is a master."

In 1902, Respighi travelled to Berlin where he received brief tuition from composer Max Bruch. Despite sources incorrectly stating that he studied with Bruch in 1908, Respighi's wife would later state that Respighi in fact did not study with Bruch at all. From 1903 to 1908, while his local reputation as a composer grew, Respighi's principal activity was his place as first violinist in the Mugellini Quintet, a touring five-piece founded by composer Bruno Mugellini. Respighi remained with the chamber group until he moved to Rome in 1913.

In 1906, Respighi completed his first of many transcriptions of pieces by 17th and 18th century composers; his version of "Lamento d'Arianna" by Claudio Monteverdi for voice and orchestra became his first international success during his visit to Berlin two years later. This second stay in Germany lasted for almost one year from September 1908 after Hungarian soprano Etelka Gerster invited him to work as an accompanist at her singing school, which influenced his vocal compositions. The composer met Arthur Nikisch, then conductor of the Berlin Philharmonic who arranged to conduct the Monteverdi transcription on stage with famed singer Julia Culp as soloist. The critical success of the performance encouraged Respighi to have his other transcriptions of older works performed in Berlin and this is considered to be a milestone in the rediscovery of Monteverdi's output.

The musical influence from Respighi's stay in Germany is discernible in his second operatic work, Semirâma. The opera premiered in Bologna in November 1910 to considerable success; two years later, critic Giannotto Bastianelli wrote that the piece marked a transition in Respighi's style from verismo to Decadentism and praised his use of rich polyphony. Working on the opera, however, left Respighi exhausted and he wrote each individual score by hand to save money. At the post-performance banquet, the composer fell asleep. It is thought that Respighi's inconsistent sleeping patterns throughout his life may have been caused by narcolepsy.

In 1910, Respighi was involved in a short lived group named the Lega dei Cinque, which also included Ildebrando Pizzetti, Gian Francesco Malipiero, Giannotto Bastianelli, and Renzo Bossi.

Life in Rome, 1913–1918 

In January 1913, Respighi left Bologna to become professor of composition at the Liceo Musicale di Santa Cecilia in Rome, a position that he held for almost a decade. Composers Vittorio Rieti and Daniele Amfitheatrof were among his students during this time. The busy atmosphere of Rome unnerved Respighi, however, and composing and teaching became increasingly difficult. He became withdrawn, suffered from irregular sleep, and wished to return to Bologna. Later in 1913, Respighi went back to Germany for some performances and then upon returning to Rome, turned his attention primarily on composition.

In 1915, composer Alfredo Casella returned to Rome after living in France for many years. Despite showing little interest, Respighi had a small involvement in Casella's new organisation, the Società Italiana di Musica Moderna. When Italy entered World War I in May 1915 Respighi, aged 36, was eligible to join the army, though his position at the Liceo Musicale granted him temporary exemption from military service. After a holiday in more peaceful surroundings for the summer, Respighi returned to Rome to continue teaching. One of his new students in his fugue and composition class was Elsa Olivieri-Sangiacomo; the two started a relationship and Elsa, fourteen years his junior, married the composer in January 1919. Their friend, librettist Claudio Guastalla, spoke of their marriage: "It functioned on an almost transcendental level of human and spiritual harmony."

Respighi was deeply saddened by his mother's death in March 1916. Upon hearing that she had become ill he delayed his departure from Rome and by the time he arrived in Bologna, she had already died from pneumonia. Respighi returned to Rome and went back to work, but this would not last and he returned to Bologna. Elsa recalled Respighi retiring to bed and refusing to eat or see anyone. He recovered in Eremo di Tizzano, a religious retreat in the country hills some 20 km south of Bologna. While there, he composed the short piece  for organ. In a letter to his friend, singer Chiarina Fino Savio, from January 1917, Respighi wrote: "I am alone, sad and sick."

In the midst of such difficult times, a turning point in Respighi's career arrived on 11 March 1917 when the first of his Roman trilogy of tone poems, Fountains of Rome, premiered in Rome with conductor Antonio Guarnieri. The premiere was originally scheduled in late 1916, but an audience riot during the first half of the concert due to their distaste for German music caused the show to end early. Respighi's disappointment with the lukewarm response from the audience fuelled his effort to start on a follow-up.

Following the premiere, Respighi underwent a short tour of Italy and Switzerland with a group of musicians, including violinist Arrigo Serato, pianist Ernesto Consolo, and Fino Savio. Upon returning to Rome, he resumed work at the  until the end of that academic year. While on vacation in Bologna in the summer of 1916, Respighi visited Viareggio to meet Russian ballet impresario Sergei Diaghilev, operator of the Ballets Russes, who wished to stage new productions based on the baroque and classical periods. Respighi accepted a sum of 1,500 lire from Diaghilev and contributed orchestrations of the piano works from Péchés de vieillesse by Gioachino Rossini which formed the basis of the music to a new ballet, La Boutique fantasque.

The commission for Diaghilev may have inspired Respighi to gather scores for what would become Suite No. 1 of his Ancient Airs and Dances, a trilogy of orchestral suites transcribed from lute pieces by 16th century Italian composers. Suite No. 1 premiered in December 1917 in Rome, after which the full score was somehow lost and Respighi was forced to re-write it using individual orchestral parts.

Rise to fame, 1918–1925 
An important milestone in Respighi's career took place when Arturo Toscanini asked the composer to have one of his compositions performed in a series of twelve concerts in Milan in February 1918. Respighi reluctantly picked Fountains of Rome, which had thus far only been performed at its 1917 premiere. The concert was a huge success and placed Respighi as one of the leading Italian composers of the early 20th century, prompting the start of a longterm, though sometimes tumultuous, relationship with Toscanini. Two months after the concert, Respighi allowed Casa Ricordi to publish the score of the tone poem in a deal that granted the composer 40% of the rental and performance rights of the work. Respighi succumbed to illness soon after with a mild case of Spanish flu. By the summer of 1918, Respighi had entered negotiations to translate and publish Italian versions of Theory of Harmony (1922) by composer Arnold Schoenberg and a book on musical counterpoint by Sergei Taneyev, but these never materialised.

In the summer of 1919, Respighi reconnected with Diaghilev in Naples to discuss another commission for the Ballets Russes. This time, Diaghilev wished to stage a revised version of Le astuzie femminili by Domenico Cimarosa, which concluded with a series of dances based on Russian musical themes. Respighi accepted, and provided new arrangements of the ballet score which premiered in Paris in 1920. Respighi was also commissioned to score for a revival of La serva padrona by Giovanni Paisiello, which also had a Russian connection. He delivered the finished manuscript one month late, in March 1920. However, Diaghilev had decided against a full stage production and used the music as part of a series of different songs and dance numbers. The score was shelved and considered lost until it was rediscovered 90 years later, after which it was performed in full in August 2014 in Bologna.

In January 1921, Respighi and Elsa began their first tour as joint performers, marking Elsa's debut as a performing concert artist. They were joined by violinist Mario Corti. The tour saw dates across Italy, followed by Prague, Brno, and Vienna. The time away from his teaching duties at the Liceo Musicale in Rome led to his employers issuing a letter suggesting he return to fulfil them for the remaining months of the academic year. By 1921, Respighi had begun a lifelong friendship with the writer and journalist Claudio Guastalla, who encouraged him to compose a new opera and offered to write its libretto. This created a spell of productivity and Respighi eagerly completed Belfagor, his first opera in a decade, without the spells of depression that usually affected him once he had finished a work. Guastalla would exclusively write the libretto for all of Respighi's future operas, and influence the conception or programmes for some of his non-operatic compositions.

In October 1921, Respighi and Elsa relocated to a flat in Palazzo Borghese in Rome which they named  (The Pines). In the following January, despite the possibility of further objections from the Liceo Musicale, they went on another tour, this time performing in Czechoslovakia. When Benito Mussolini came to power later in 1922, Respighi steered a neutral course towards the Fascist government. His growing international fame allowed the composer some level of freedom, but at the same time encouraged the regime to exploit his music for political purposes. Respighi vouched for more outspoken critics such as Toscanini, allowing them to continue to work under the regime. In 1923, Respighi became the first director of the now state-funded  in Rome. He disliked the time consuming administrative duties that the position required; in 1926, he resigned to dedicate more time to compose. Respighi continued to teach an advanced composition course at the conservatory until 1935.

Respighi's second Roman tone poem, Pines of Rome, premiered in December 1924 at the Augusteo Theatre in Rome. It went on to become one of his most widely known and recorded pieces.

In 1925, he collaborated with Sebastiano Arturo Luciani on an elementary textbook entitled Orpheus.

International recognition, 1925–1936 
By the mid-1920s, Respighi's growing worldwide fame encouraged the composer to travel extensively, conducting his own pieces, or performing as soloist for his piano compositions. He made his first visit to America in December 1925 to perform and conduct a series of concerts; his first took place at Carnegie Hall on 31 December as soloist for the premiere of his piano and orchestral work, Concerto in modo misolidio ("Concerto in the Mixolydian Mode").

In May 1927, Respighi and Elsa travelled to Brazil to engage in a concert series of his own music in Rio de Janeiro. The musical style and local customs inspired Respighi, who told the press of his intention to return in the following year with a five-part orchestral suite based on his visit. Respighi did return to Rio, in June 1928, but the composition was finalised in the form of an orchestral work in three movements entitled  ("Brazilian Impressions"). In September 1927, Respighi conducted the premiere of his  ("Botticelli Triptych"), a three-movement orchestral piece inspired by three paintings by Sandro Botticelli located in Vienna. He dedicated it to American pianist Elizabeth Sprague Coolidge, the patron for the work.

In November 1928, Respighi returned to America for the premiere of his piano and orchestral work,  ("Toccata for Piano and Orchestra"). It took place that month at Carnegie Hall with Willem Mengelberg conducting the New York Philharmonic Orchestra with the composer as soloist. By the year's end Respighi completed his third Roman tone poem, Roman Festivals, composed in just nine days. It premiered on 21 February 1929 at Carnegie Hall in New York City with Arturo Toscanini conducting the New York Philharmonic. The Italian premiere followed on 17 March. Having completed the work, Respighi felt that he had incorporated the "maximum of orchestral sonority and colour" from the orchestra and could no longer write such large scale pieces. It was at this time he started to favour compositions for smaller ensembles.

At the end of 1929, Respighi had conductor Serge Koussevitzky forward a proposal to Sergei Rachmaninoff which involved permission to orchestrate a selection of pieces from his two Études-Tableaux (Op. 33 and Op. 39) sets for piano. An enthusiastic Rachmaninoff accepted the offer and supplied Respighi with the program descriptions behind five pieces which were previously kept secret. Koussevitzky conducted Respighi's orchestrations, entitled , for the premiere with the Boston Symphony Orchestra in November 1931. He wrote that Respighi's arrangements were "very good" and demanding of the orchestra, which required eight rehearsals. Rachmaninoff  thanked Respighi for his work and in particular, for being faithful to the original scores. Later in 1930, Respighi completed a commission piece to commemorate the fiftieth anniversary of the Boston Symphony Orchestra. The result was Metamorphoseon, Modi XII, an orchestral piece containing a theme and eight variations.

In 1932, the Fascist government honoured Respighi with membership of the Reale Accademia d'Italia, one of the highest honors awarded to the most eminent people in Italian science and culture. From 1933 until his death, Respighi completed no new compositions. Among his final works was Huntingtower: Ballad for Band in 1932, which was a commission from Edwin Franko Goldman and the American Bandmasters Association in honor of the recent death of composer and conductor John Philip Sousa. Respighi wrote it in six weeks, and based it on a recent visit to Huntingtower Castle in Scotland. It was his only piece scored for a band. Also in 1932, Respighi completed his second concert tour of the US.

Respighi's opera La fiamma ("The Flame") premiered at the Teatro dell'Opera di Roma in January 1934, with the composer as conductor. This was followed by a visit to Uruguay, where several orchestral concerts were arranged for radio broadcast.

By May 1935, Respighi had cancelled several engagements due to ill health, including a scheduled trip to conduct a series of concerts at the Hollywood Bowl in Los Angeles. By November, he had completed a piano draft and the majority of the orchestral arrangements of his next opera, Lucrezia. He had planned to work on a transcription of an opera by Francesco Cavalli that was to be staged alongside Lucrezia during the 1936–37 season at the La Scala in Milan, but declining health caused him to stop work. Neither work was completed in Respighi's lifetime; Elsa finished Lucrezia after Respighi's death with Respighi's former pupil Ennio Porrino, in 1937.

Death and legacy

While working on his opera Lucrezia at the end of 1935, Respighi became ill with a fever and fatigue. Subsequent medical checks in January 1936 revealed samples of S. viridans bacteria in his blood, leading to the diagnosis of subacute bacterial endocarditis, a heart infection still untreatable at the time and probably brought on by his recent throat infection and oral surgery. Respighi's health deteriorated over the next four months, during which he received three blood transfusions and experimental treatment with sulphonamides imported from Germany. Elsa made a conscious effort to hide the severity of the illness to others, except for a select few. Respighi died on 18 April in Rome, aged 56, from complications of blood poisoning. Elsa and several friends were by his side. The funeral was held two days later. His body lay in state at Santa Maria del Popolo until the spring of 1937, when the remains were re-interred at the Certosa di Bologna, next to poet Giosuè Carducci. Inscribed on his tomb are his name and crosses; the dates of his birth and death are not given.

Elsa survived her husband for nearly 60 years, unfailingly championing her husband's works and legacy. A few months after Respighi's death, Elsa wrote to Guastalla: "I live because I can truly still do something for him. And I shall do it, that is certain, until the day I die." However, Italian governments following Mussolini's death in 1945 distanced themselves from nationalistic composers, placing Respighi in a group among those including Malipiero, Ildebrando Pizzetti, and Pietro Mascagni and newspapers protested against honours bestowed upon Elsa. Despite this, in 1961, the twenty-fifth anniversary of Respighi's death, Elsa donated a collection of unpublished and incomplete manuscripts to the Liceo Musicale in Bologna, now the Conservatorio G. B. Martini, where Respighi had studied. In 1969, she helped establish the Fondo Ottorino Respighi, a foundation at the Fondazione Cini in Venice which included a large number of letters and photographs documenting her husband's career. Elsa was also at the forefront of the Respighi centenary celebrations in 1979 to commemorate the 100th anniversary of Respighi's birth, though it was vehemently opposed by the Italian Left for ideological reasons. She later said that "musical progressives with left-wing political sympathies" tried to discredit Respighi's legacy. The commemoration saw a number of long-neglected works of his performed and recorded for the first time. Elsa died in 1996, one week short of her 102nd birthday.

In 1993, Swiss conductor Adriano founded the Respighi Society in London in an effort to make Respighi's "life and works [...] better known and understood by the dissemination of accurate and impartial information." It has since been dissolved.

In March 2000, a commemorative plaque was unveiled on Via Guido Reni in Bologna, Respighi's birthplace.

In 2006, Italian conductor and composer Salvatore Di Vittorio was approached by Respighi's great-nieces, Elsa Pizzoli Mazzacane and Gloria Pizzoli Mangini, who, along with Respighi archiver and cataloger Potito Pedarra, commissioned Di Vittorio to complete several of Respighi's incomplete and previously unpublished compositions. This included the Violin Concerto in A major from 1903, which premiered in 2010 with Di Vittorio conducting the Chamber Orchestra of New York, which he founded in 2006. The orchestra continues to premiere ongoing new editions by Di Vittorio of Respighi's music in premieres as well as recordings on Naxos Records. In 2008, Di Vittorio completed his Overture Respighiana, an orchestral work as an homage to Respighi.

Works

Opera

Re Enzo (1905)
Semirâma (1909)
Marie Victoire (completed in 1913, but not produced until 2004)
La bella dormente nel bosco (1922)
Belfagor (1923)
La campana sommersa (1927)
Maria egiziaca (1932)
La fiamma (1934)
Lucrezia (1937) opera in 1 act (completed posthumously by his wife, Elsa, and his pupil Ennio Porrino)

Ballet
La Boutique fantasque (1918), borrows tunes from the 19th-century Italian composer Rossini. Premiered in London on 5 June 1919.
Sèvres de la vieille France (1920), transcription of 17th- and 18th-century French music
La Pentola magica (1920), based on popular Russian themes
Scherzo Veneziano (Le astuzie di Columbina) (1920)
Belkis, Regina di Saba (1932)

Orchestral

Preludio, corale e fuga (1901)
Aria per archi (1901)
Leggenda for Violin and Orchestra P 36 (1902)
Piano Concerto in A minor (1902)
Suite per archi (1902)
Humoreske for Violin and Orchestra P 45 (1903)
Violin Concerto in A major (1903), completed by Salvatore Di Vittorio (2009)
Fantasia Slava (1903)
Suite in E major (Sinfonia) (1903)
Serenata per piccola orchestra (1904)
Suite in Sol Maggiore (1905), for organ and strings
Ouverture Burlesca (1906)
Concerto all'antica for Violin and Orchestra (1908)
Ouverture Carnevalesca (1913)
Tre Liriche (1913), for mezzo-soprano and orchestra (Notte, Nebbie, Pioggia)
Sinfonia Drammatica (1914)
Fountains of Rome (1916)
Ancient Airs and Dances Suite No. 1 (1917), based on Renaissance lute pieces by Simone Molinaro, Vincenzo Galilei (father of Galileo Galilei), and additional anonymous composers.
Ballata delle Gnomidi (Dance of the Gnomes) (1920), based on a poem by Claudio Clausetti
Adagio con variazioni (1921), for Cello and Orchestra
Concerto Gregoriano for Violin and Orchestra (1921)
Ancient Airs and Dances Suite No. 2 (1923), based on pieces for lute, archlute, and viol by Fabritio Caroso, Jean-Baptiste Besard, Bernardo Gianoncelli, and an anonymous composer. It also interpolates an aria attributed to Marin Mersenne.
Pines of Rome (1924)
Concerto in modo misolidio (Concerto in the Mixolydian mode) (1925)
Poema autunnale (Autumn Poem), for Violin and Orchestra (1925)
Rossiniana (1925), free transcriptions from Rossini's Quelques riens (from Péchés de vieillesse)
Vetrate di chiesa (Church Windows) (1926), four movements of which three are based on Tre Preludi sopra melodie gregoriane for piano (1919)
Trittico Botticelliano (1927), three movements inspired by Botticelli paintings in the Uffizi Gallery, Florence: La Primavera, L'Adorazione dei Magi, and La nascita di Venere. The middle movement uses the well-known tune Veni Emmanuel (O Come, O Come, Emmanuel)
Impressioni brasiliane (Brazilian Impressions) (1928)

Vocal/choral
Nebbie (1906), voice and piano
Stornellatrice (1906), voice and piano
Cinque canti all'antica (1906), voice and piano
Il Lamento di Arianna (1908), for mezzo-soprano and orchestra
Aretusa (text by Shelley) (1911), cantata for mezzo-soprano and orchestra
Tre Liriche (1913), for mezzo-soprano and orchestra (Notte, Nebbie, Pioggia)
La Sensitiva (The Sensitive Plant, text by Shelley) (1914), for mezzo-soprano and orchestra
Il Tramonto (The sunset, text by Shelley) (1914), for mezzo-soprano and string quartet (or string orchestra)
Cinque liriche (1917), voice and piano
Quattro liriche (Gabriele D'Annunzio) (1920), voice and piano
La Primavera (The Spring, texts by Constant Zarian) (1922) lyric poem for soli, chorus and orchestra
Deità silvane (Woodland Deities, texts by Antonio Rubino) (1925), song-cycle for soprano and small orchestra
Lauda per la Natività del Signore (Laud to the Nativity, text attributed to Jacopone da Todi) (1930), a cantata for three soloists (soprano, mezzo-soprano, tenor), mixed chorus (including substantial sections for 8-part mixed and TTBB male chorus), and chamber ensemble (woodwinds and piano 4-hands)

Chamber
String Quartet in D major in one movement (undated)
String Quartet No. 1 in D major (1892–98)
String Quartet No. 2 in B-flat major (1898)
String Quartet in D major (1907)
String Quartet in D minor (1909) subtitled by composer "Ernst ist das Leben, heiter ist die Kunst"
Quartetto Dorico or Doric String Quartet (1924)
Tre Preludi sopra melodie gregoriane, for piano (1921)
Violin Sonata in D minor (1897)
Violin Sonata in B minor (1917)
Piano Sonata in F minor (1897–98)
Variazioni, for guitar
Double Quartet in D minor (1901)
Piano Quintet in F minor (1902)
Six pieces for violin and piano (1901–06)
Six pieces for piano (1903–05)
Quartet in D major for 4 Viols (1906)
Huntingtower: Ballad for Band (1932)
String Quintet for 2 Violins, 1 Viola & 2 Violoncellos in G minor (1901, incomplete)

Books
Orpheus (1926; modern edition: 2020)

References

Sources

Further reading
Respighi, Elsa (1955) Fifty Years of a Life in Music
Respighi, Elsa (1962) Ottorino Respighi, London: Ricordi
Cantù, Alberto (1985) Respighi Compositore, Edizioni EDA, Torino
Barrow, Lee G (2004) Ottorino Respighi (1879–1936): An Annotated Bibliography, Scarecrow Press
Viagrande, Riccardo, La generazione dell'Ottanta, Casa Musicale Eco, Monza, 2007
 Daniele Gambaro, Ottorino Respighi. Un'idea di modernità nel Novecento, pp. XII+246, illustrato con esempi musicali, novembre 2011, Zecchini Editore,

External links

 OttorinoRespighi.it 
 Amici di Respighi 
 Fondo Ottorino Respighi 
 Chamber Orchestra of New York "Ottorino Respighi"
 Ottorino Respighi String Quartet in D Major (1907) Sound-bites and discussion
 
 

1879 births
1936 deaths
20th-century classical composers
20th-century Italian composers
20th-century Italian male musicians
Academic staff of Conservatorio Santa Cecilia
Conservatorio Giovanni Battista Martini alumni
Deaths from endocarditis
Impressionist composers
Italian ballet composers
Italian classical composers
Italian male classical composers
Italian opera composers
Italian Romantic composers
Male opera composers
Members of the Royal Academy of Italy
Neoclassical composers
Musicians from Bologna
Pupils of Nikolai Rimsky-Korsakov
19th-century Italian male musicians